Sumeet Raghavan (born 22 April 1971)  is an Indian film, television, and theatre actor known for his roles in Wagle Ki Duniya - Nayi Peedi Naye Kissey, Hudd Kar Di, Sarabhai vs Sarabhai, Sajan Re Jhoot Mat Bolo, Badi Doooor Se Aaye Hai, and Sarabhai vs Sarabhai: Take 2. As a child actor, he played the role of Sudama in Mahabharat serial of B. R. Chopra.

Early life
Raghavan was born to Tamil father, Mr. R. Raghavan and a Kannadiga mother, Mrs. Prema Raghavan.  He married Chinmayee Surve in 1996.

Filmography

Television

Films

Dubbing roles

Animated series

Live action films

See also
 Dubbing (filmmaking)
 List of Indian dubbing artists

Footnotes

References

External links

 

Living people
Indian male child actors
Indian male voice actors
Male actors in Hindi cinema
Indian male television actors
1971 births